Darragh O'Connor (born 5 August 1999) is an Irish professional footballer who plays as a central defender for Greenock Morton.

Early and personal life
O'Connor was born in Croydon, England to Irish parents and moved to Clonroche, County Wexford, Ireland in 2005. Some media have incorrectly reported him to have been born in Wexford.

Career
O'Connor spent his early career with Cloughbawn, Waterford, Shamrock Rovers, and Wexford, before signing for Leicester City in 2019. O'Connor moved to Scottish Premiership club Motherwell in July 2021.

On 28 January 2022, O'Connor signed on loan for Dumfries club Queen of the South until the end of the 2021-22 season. He made a total of 17 appearances for the club in all competitions during his loan spell, scoring once.

On 25 May 2022, it was announced that O'Connor had signed a pre-contract agreement with Scottish Championship side Greenock Morton, signing on a permanent basis on a one-year contract. The contract was extended in February 2023 until summer of 2024.

Career statistics

References

1999 births
Living people
Republic of Ireland association footballers
Waterford F.C. players
Shamrock Rovers F.C. players
Wexford F.C. players
Leicester City F.C. players
Motherwell F.C. players
Queen of the South F.C. players
Greenock Morton F.C. players
League of Ireland players
Scottish Professional Football League players
Association football defenders
Footballers from Croydon
English emigrants to Ireland